Küçükova can refer to:

 Küçükova, Aşkale
 Küçükova, Maden